The Battle of Tutong of 1934 occurred when Gen. Ma Zhongying's Chinese Muslim 36th Division was attacked by the Soviet Red Army on the banks of the frozen Tutung River. The battle took place over several days, and Soviet bombers used mustard gas. At one point the Chinese Muslim troops dressed up in sheepskins for camouflage in the snow, and stormed Soviet machine-gun posts with curved swords at a short range and defeated a Soviet pincer attack. Casualties were getting heavy on both sides before Ma Zhongying ordered a retreat.

References 

Conflicts in 1934
1934 in China
1934 in the Soviet Union
China–Soviet Union relations
Military operations involving chemical weapons
Wars involving the Soviet Union
Military history of the Soviet Union
Military history of the Republic of China (1912–1949)
Xinjiang Wars
Battles involving the Soviet Union
Soviet chemical weapons program